Highway museum complex is the Sri Lanka's first highway museum and is located in Kiribathkumbura, Kandy. The museum is maintained by the Road Development Authority.

The museum has a collection of former construction equipment such as stone road rollers, steam road rollers, oil road rollers, tar boilers, coal scales, road signs and a model of the Bogoda Wooden Bridge. It is reported that some of the equipment on display is over 175 years old.

Opening hours 
There are no entrance fees to visitors and there are no time limits since it is situated in an open space area alongside the A1 highway.

See also
List of museums in Sri Lanka

References 

Museums in Kandy District
Road transport in Sri Lanka
Transport museums